Basak (Bosak) is a Hindu surname in the Bengal region, Bihar, Jharkhand and Assam. In West Bengal and Assam this surname is written as Basak while in some districts of Bihar as Basak or Bosak. The name is also spelt Bysack or Basacks by different families.

Geographical distribution
As of 2014, 58.5% of all known Basaks were residents of India and 30.1% were residents of Bangladesh. In India, the frequency of the name was higher than national average in:
West Bengal (1: 717)
Tripura (1: 1,334)

Notables
 Subimal Basak	
 Gour Das Bysack
 Netai Chand Bysack
 Arun Kumar Basak
 Jharna Basak
 Soumen Basak
 Birendra Basak
 Biren Kumar Basak
 Gour Das Bysack
 Shyamal Bashak

References

Indian surnames
Bengali Hindu surnames